One Africa Television is a Namibian free-to-air television station founded in 2003. It was founded by Paul van Schalkwyk in 2003, which was the first private television network in the country.

In 2020, it was bought by TribeFire Studius Group.

One Africa Television founder and group chairman, Paul van Schalkwyk, was killed in a plane crash on the 10th of March 2014.

Programming
The channel airs the following segments:

TodayOnOne (community news and current affairs,  daily)
LearnOnOne (school and adult educational,  extra classes, daytime TV, www.learnononbe.org)
It's A Wrap (current affairs commentary)
The Tribe (local music)
Foreign programs, such as 7de Laan and BBC are also airing from SABC.

Distribution
In line with Namibia's Digital Terrestrial Television Policy, One Africa's analogue transmission through antenna was switched off on 20 October 2017.

References

External links
 
Namibia Trade Directory

Television channels in Namibia
Television channels and stations established in 2003
2003 establishments in Namibia
Mass media in Windhoek